Jinwan District is a district of Zhuhai, Guangdong province, China.

Zhuhai Jinwan Airport is in the district.

Subdistricts

References

County-level divisions of Guangdong
Zhuhai